Hoshihananomia libanica is a species of beetle in the genus Hoshihananomia of the family Mordellidae, which is part of the superfamily Tenebrionoidea. The species was discovered in 1942.

References

Beetles described in 1942
Mordellidae